Sunshine is an unincorporated community in Garland County, Arkansas, United States. On April 25, 2011, high winds – possibly a tornado – part of the storm system associated with the 2011 Super Outbreak hit the Sunshine area, destroying houses and trapping and injuring two people.

References

Unincorporated communities in Garland County, Arkansas
Unincorporated communities in Arkansas